David Stevenson (born 26 October 1958) is a Scottish former footballer who played for Partick Thistle, Dumbarton, East Fife and Falkirk.

References

1958 births
Scottish footballers
Dumbarton F.C. players
Partick Thistle F.C. players
Falkirk F.C. players
Scottish Football League players
Living people
Association football central defenders